Altus Press is a publisher of works primarily related to the pulp magazines from the 1910s to the 1950s.

History
Founded in 2006 by Matthew Moring, Altus Press publishes collections primarily focussed on series characters, although they also publish stand-alone novels and short stories too. They are also the publisher of the new Doc Savage novels written by Lester Dent and Will Murray, as well as Murray's new Tarzan novels.

Their pulp reprints are either single- or multi-volume collections, containing all the stories of a specific character, with new introductions written by pulp historians. Due to this editorial decision, many are spread across several volumes.

Altus Press has relaunched the pulp magazines Argosy, Black Mask, and Famous Fantastic Mysteries.

References

External links
 steegerbooks.com, the publisher's homepage.

Pulp fiction